The 2016 Asian Men's Youth Handball Championship was the 7th edition of the Asian Men's Youth Handball Championship held from 27 August - 5 September 2016 at Manama, Bahrain under the aegis of Asian Handball Federation. Is also acted as the qualification tournament for the 2017 Men's Youth World Handball Championship to be held in Georgia.

Preliminary groups

 Islamic Republic of Iran withdrew from the championship after the draw due to security conditions in Bahrain.

Competition schedule

Group A

Group B

5th–8th Placement Matches

5th–8th Placement Semifinals

7th–8th-place match

5th–6th-place match

Knockout stage

Semifinal matches

Bronze-medal match

Gold-medal match

Final standings

References

Asian Mens Youth Handball Championship, 2016
Asia
Asian Handball Championships
International handball competitions hosted by Bahrain